Captain Magal is a 1993 Indian Tamil-language action thriller film directed by Bharathiraja, starring Raja and Khushbu. It was released on 14 January 1993.

Plot

Cast 
Raja (voice dubbed by Nizhalgal Ravi)
Khushbu
Livingston
Napoleon
G. M. Kumar
Janagaraj

Production 
The film was partly shot at Ooty.

Soundtrack 
The music was composed by Hamsalekha and lyrics were written by Vairamuthu.

Release and reception 
Captain Magal was released on 14 January 1993, Pongal day. The Indian Express wrote, "Captain Magal is a C-grade English thriller, a pathetic attempt at making an action film. It has disjointed scenes, jerky narration and a loosely etched screenplay that seems more of a hotch-potch of various English films". Kalki wrote that frame by frame throughout the film, one could see the director using his own techniques; when the story unfolds the techniques that is supposed to derail the story becomes like the mammoth elephant hiding in the tree.

References

External links 
 

1990s Tamil-language films
1993 action thriller films
1993 films
Films about terrorism in India
Films directed by Bharathiraja
Films scored by Hamsalekha
Films set in forests
Home invasions in film
Indian action thriller films